Bekilli is a town and a district of Denizli Province in the inner Aegean region of Turkey. Bekilli district area neighbors the district areas of Çal and Çivril, both also depending Denizli to the west, south and east, and those of two districts of Uşak Province to the north, namely Ulubey and Karahallı. 

The town has 11 villages. They are Bükrüce, Çamköy, Çoğaşlı, Deşdemir, Gömce, İkizbaba, Köselli, Poyrazlı, Sırıklı, Üçkuyu and Yeşiloba (also known as Medele).

The town is renowned for its vineyards and celebrates an annual wine festival. Viticulture is a principal constituent of local culture. 

Until the confirmation of its site slightly north of the town and south of the present-day neighboring district center of Karahallı, at a very short distance from Bekilli, the location of Bekilli was one of the leading candidates matched with ancient Pepuza (as well as its neighboring Tymion), associated with Montanism. Nevertheless, there are interesting and yet largely unexplored traces dating from Phrygian, Lydian, Roman and early Christian and Byzantine periods within Bekilli district area itself.

References

External links

 The local radio station
 Bekilli Municipality
 Prefecture of Bekilli

Denizli
Populated places in Denizli Province
Districts of Denizli Province